Gerrit Huy (born 13 May 1953) is a German politician for the right-wing AfD and since 2021 member of the Bundestag, the federal diet.

Life and politics 

Huy was born 1953 in the West German city of Braunschweig and was elected to the Bundestag in 2021.

References 

Living people
1953 births
People from Braunschweig
Alternative for Germany politicians
Members of the Bundestag 2021–2025
21st-century German politicians
21st-century German women politicians
Female members of the Bundestag